Hebilli is a village in Akdeniz district  of Mersin Province, Turkey. (Akdeniz district center is a part of Greater Mersin). It is situated to the north of Çukurova Motorway in Çukurova (Cilicia) plains. The population of the village was 526 as of 2012.

The population of the village is largely composed of descendants of Turkish refugees from the island of Crete (now part of Greece) during the last years of the 19th century. There is an Arabic castle ruin in the village built in the medieval age. (see Hebilli Castle) Main economic activity of the village is citrus farming.

Climate 
The climate in Hebilli is warm and temperate. There is more rainfall in the winter than in the summer in Hebilli. The climate is classified as Csa by the Köppen-Geiger system. The average annual temperature is 18.3 °C in Hebilli. The warmest temperatures falling in August, averaging 27.4 °C, whereas the coldest moth is January, with temperatures averaging 9.3 °C. Precipitation averages 699 mm.

References

Villages in Akdeniz District